Sheikhupur is a village in Kapurthala. Kapurthala is a district of Punjab in India.

About 
Sheikhupur is almost 3 km from Kapurthala.  The nearest railway station from Sheikhupur is Kapurthala railway station.

Post Code & STD Code 
Sheikhupur has its own post office.  Its Post Code and STD Code are 144620 & 01822 respectively.
The Rail Coach Factory is 4 km from Sheikhupur and 7–8 km from Kapurthala. RCF is the biggest factory in Asia. This village is famous for Mata Bhadra Kali temple. Every year a big festival called "mela" is held here in May/June.

References

Kapurthala

Villages in Kapurthala district